Mattiana was a Roman-Berber civitas in the province of Africa Proconsularis. The locale existed during late antiquity, and was situated in northern Tunisia.

In antiquity, the town was also the seat of a Catholic bishopric, suffragan of the Archdiocese of Carthage.
The historical sources mention only one known bishop, Marcellus, who took part in the Council of Carthage of 646.
Today Mattiana survives as a titular bishopric of the Roman Catholic Church and the current bishop is Carlos Alberto Salcedo Ojeda of Huancayo,
 who replaced Edmar Peron in 2016.

References
 

Ancient Berber cities
Catholic titular sees in Africa
Former Roman Catholic dioceses in Africa
Roman towns and cities in Tunisia
Archaeological sites in Tunisia